Optimus is an unincorporated community in Stone County, Arkansas, United States. The Miles Jeffery Barn, which is listed on the National Register of Historic Places, is located in Optimus.

References

Unincorporated communities in Stone County, Arkansas
Unincorporated communities in Arkansas